Mary B. Schuenemann (September 5, 1898 – June 15, 1992) was born in Philadelphia, Pennsylvania. Her life was dedicated to the arts, in particular the painting of watercolors. She was influenced by the artistic trends of the East Coast.

Her summer home was in Pineville, New Jersey, where she often found her themes of water, boats, fishing paraphernalia, characterized by intense juxtapositions of color. Schuenemann was a product of the developments of the arts in the early part of the 20th century in America. She worked in oils, pastels, and watercolors, her favorite medium being watercolor. Schuenemann received a degree from the University of Pennsylvania with further studies at the Philadelphia College of Arts, the Tyler School of Art, and the Modern School of Painting in Gloucester, Massachusetts, where she studied with Earl Horter, Earnest Thum, and John Lear.

She received numerous awards from art associations, including five gold medals, and four silver medals. Schuenemann had many solo shows at prestigious institutions, including Philadelphia Art Alliance, Woodier Art Gallery, The Plastic Club of Philadelphia, Abington Art Center, Pennsylvania Academy of the Fine Arts, and Philadelphia Museum of Art. She is listed in Who's Who of American Women Painters, Who’s Who in the East, and Who's Who in American Art.

References

1898 births
1992 deaths
American women painters
Artists from Philadelphia
University of the Arts (Philadelphia) alumni
University of Pennsylvania alumni
20th-century American painters
20th-century American women artists